Magee is a city in Simpson County, Mississippi, United States. It is part of the Jackson metropolitan area.

History
The first settlers in the area were Arthur Mangum and Phil Magee, who came into the area around 1820. Pioneers from Virginia and the Carolinas followed. The town of Magee was originally named Mangum, after Arthur Mangum; it kept this name until 1859.

In 1840, Willis Magee built a grist mill on Little Goodwater Creek, inside the present city limits. He started the first and only postal service in the area in 1855.

Robert Solomon Magee was the first post master in Magee and the city of Magee was named after him.

Richard Farthing came to Magee in 1859 when he was in the leather tanning business. He bought 80 acres of land and also built a tanyard and used water from the mill pond to tan his leather. The population of Magee in 1919 was 786. There were approximately 23 businesses in the area at the time.

Magee is approximately 42 miles south of Jackson, 45 miles north of Hattiesburg, and 12 miles south of Mendenhall, the county seat of Simpson County.

Magee's first mayor was R.P. Vinson, who served from 1900 to 1907.

In 2013, First Baptist Church in downtown Magee was seriously damaged by a fire but has been restored.

Windham's Restaurant is located in Magee, and was established in 1963, locally known as "Zip's". In 2015, the Zip Burger was voted the best hamburger in Mississippi.

In 2017, the Magee Sportsplex was renamed the Jimmy Clyde Sportsplex in honor of former Magee mayor Jimmy Clyde.

As of 2017, the mayor of Magee is Dale Berry.

The city of Magee was featured in the Discovery Channel reality TV series Dirty Jobs.

Geography
Magee is located between Jackson and Hattiesburg on U.S. Highway 49 at the intersection of three Mississippi Highways: 541, 545, and 28. Magee is approximately 155 miles north of New Orleans, Louisiana, and approximately 142 miles north of Mobile, Alabama.

Climate

March 2009 tornado
On March 26, 2009, around 1:30 a.m., an EF3 tornado struck the north part of the city. The tornado destroyed 60 homes and caused 25 injuries, with no fatalities. The tornado significantly damaged the town's water treatment plant, interrupting service to the entire town. Circuit Riders and other technicians from the Mississippi Rural Water Association worked with the city staff, local contractors and the Mississippi Emergency Management Agency to restore water service. Using four MEMA generators, the rural water staff was able to restore service to Magee by 2:20 p.m. the next day.

Demographics

2020 census

As of the 2020 United States census, there were 3,988 people, 1,465 households, and 933 families residing in the city.

2000 census
As of the census of 2000, there were 4,200 people, 1,573 households, and 984 families residing in the city. The population density was 860.5 people per square mile (332.3/km2). There were 1,725 housing units at an average density of 353.4 per square mile (136.5/km2). The racial makeup of the city was 62.67% White, 33.88% African American, 0.07% Native American, 0.26% Asian, 2.31% from other races, and 0.81% from two or more races. Hispanic or Latino people of any race were 3.62% of the population.

There were 1,573 households, out of which 29.9% had children under the age of 18 living with them, 39.6% were married couples living together, 18.8% had a female householder with no husband present, and 37.4% were non-families. 33.4% of all households were made up of individuals, and 14.9% had someone living alone who was 65 years of age or older. The average household size was 2.37 and the average family size was 3.02.

In the city, the population was spread out, with 27.7% under the age of 18, 9.9% from 18 to 24, 26.3% from 25 to 44, 19.2% from 45 to 64, and 16.8% who were 65 years of age or older. The median age was 34 years. For every 100 females, there were 93.5 males. For every 100 females age 18 and over, there were 83.8 males.

The median income for a household in the city was $20,779, and the median income for a family was $24,176. Males had a median income of $23,690 versus $16,767 for females. The per capita income for the city was $11,257. About 24.6% of families and 28.4% of the population were below the poverty line, including 42.9% of those under age 18 and 17.0% of those age 65 or over.

Economy

Prominent area industries include Tyson Foods, Polk's Meat Products, Real Pure Beverage Group, and Howard Industry.

The Simpson County Development Foundation Industrial Park is an ultramodern,  industrial park located on four-lane Highway 49.

Arts and culture

The Chamber of Commerce sponsors the annual Homecoming, the Christmas Parade, tree lighting and caroling.

Crazy Day is an annual event on Main Street, traditionally held the third Saturday of the month of September. Locals set up booths to sell products or homemade goods.

Magee is also the home of the former Broadcountry Cinema 3 Theater, opened in 1985 and owned by Butch McCall. The theater was closed in 2010.

A new civic center provides space for meetings for civic clubs and other organizations and houses the Magee Chamber of Commerce office.

Magee Public Library, the first public library in Magee, was established in 1935. Maude Turner was librarian. In 1937, the library was named Mims Williams Memorial Library. It is now a member of the Central Mississippi Regional Library System. The new library was built in 1975.

Education
The City of Magee is served by the Simpson County School District.

Public schools
 Magee High School
 Magee Middle School
 Magee Elementary

Higher learning
A branch of Copiah-Lincoln Community College is located in Magee.

Media

Newspapers
The Magee Courier and Simpson County News serve Magee.

Online news 
Mageenews.com serves the local area.

Radio and television
 WSJC 810 AM (talk radio)
 WKXI 107.5 FM (urban adult contemporary)
 WSMP-LP 96.9 FM (owned by Church Alive)
 WRBJ-TV channel 34, a television station licensed to Magee, but serving Jackson and with no presence in Magee

Infrastructure

Transportation
 Highways: U.S. Hwy 49; State Highways 28, 545, and 541.
 Railroad: Canadian National Railway (formally Illinois Central) serves the Magee area.
 Bus lines: Greyhound Bus serves the area.
 Airport: The Magee Municipal Airport (FAA identifier 17M) is located three miles west of Magee. It maintains a lighted  ×  runway and is attended 24 hours a day. There is a hangar, lobby and office building complex (no control tower). The complex is equipped with automatic dusk to dawn lights, a beacon, and a wind directional device.

Public services

A new city hall, police station and city jail have been completed. There are 16 full-time police personnel, including the Chief of Police and 12 auxiliary officers.

Magee has 36 trained volunteer firemen and one full-time Fire Marshall, four class A pumpers, 1 class A pumper/tanker, 1 ladder truck, one rescue unit and two utility trucks. Emergency medical services are provided by ASAP EMS, CORP.

In the Magee, Mississippi National Guard Unit, there are 149 members with five full-time personnel.

Notable people
 Roland Dale, professional football player
 Woody Evans, librarian and writer
 Micah Xavier Johnson, perpetrator of the 2016 Dallas ambush
 John Mangum, professional football player
 Kris Mangum, professional football player
 David Myers, politician
 Dan Monroe Russell Jr., United States federal judge
 Terrill Shaw, professional football player
 Harold Shaw, professional football player
 Prentiss Walker, farmer, businessman and politician
 Joseph Warren, Politician 
 Joshua Hayes, professional baseball player

References

Cities in Mississippi
Cities in Simpson County, Mississippi
Cities in Jackson metropolitan area, Mississippi